Vega is the third album by the Progressive metal band Janvs.

Track listing
 "Torri di Vetro" - 07:17
 "Saphire" - 06:38
 "Tarab" - 07:57
 "Dazed" - 01:46
 "Mediterraneo" - 06:23
 "Vega" - 07:51
 "Vesper II" - 11:13

Credits
 Matteo "Vinctor" Barelli - Vocals, guitar, keyboards, programming
 Claudio "Malphas" Fogliato - Bass
 Massimo "m:A Fog" Altomare - Drums

External links
 Encyclopaedia Metallum page

2008 albums
Janvs albums